The 1997–98 NBA season was the 52nd season of the National Basketball Association. The season ended with the Chicago Bulls winning their third straight championship and sixth in the last eight years, beating the Utah Jazz 4 games to 2 in the 1998 NBA Finals. It also marked the departure of Michael Jordan and the end of the dynasty for the Chicago Bulls.

This was the last time that both NBA and NHL regular seasons ended on the same day.

Notable occurrences

 The 1998 NBA All-Star Game was played at Madison Square Garden. However, the Slam Dunk Contest was not held, due to the risk of player injuries, lack of new dunking tricks and lack of big-name players in recent competitions. Instead, a 2Ball competition was held. Los Angeles Lakers guard Kobe Bryant became the youngest All-Star starter at age 19. The East beat the West, 135–114 for the third consecutive year, as Michael Jordan won his third All-Star MVP.
 The Washington Bullets were renamed the "Wizards". They began the season at US Airways Arena, then in December, they played their first game at the MCI Center (later Verizon Center, now Capital One Arena) during this season.
 Due to the demolition of The Omni and the construction of the new Philips Arena, the Atlanta Hawks split home games between Georgia Tech's Alexander Coliseum (Their original home where they played for four seasons when they moved to Atlanta in 1968.) and the Georgia Dome.
 Golden State Warriors swingman Latrell Sprewell made headlines by choking Warriors head coach P. J. Carlesimo during practice on December 1, 1997. Sprewell was ultimately suspended for 68 games, at the time the longest in NBA history. Sprewell would be traded to the New York Knicks in the off-season that followed.
 Michael Jordan passed Kareem Abdul-Jabbar as the all-time leader in points scored in the NBA Playoffs. The record stood for nearly 20 years until it was broken by LeBron James in 2017.
 The Utah Jazz and the Chicago Bulls shared the league's best record at 62–20, and met each other in the NBA Finals. The Jazz had home-court advantage by virtue of the head-to-head match-up (the Jazz won the season series 2–0).
 Two new records were set in Game 3 of the NBA Finals: biggest margin of victory (42 points) and fewest points scored in an NBA Finals game (54) in the Bulls' rout of the Jazz.
 The San Antonio Spurs set a league record for the biggest single-season turnaround (36 wins), breaking their own record set in the 1989–90 NBA season; it was later broken by the 2007–08 Boston Celtics.
 Following head coach Phil Jackson's decision to not return to the Bulls, Michael Jordan announced his second retirement from the NBA during the following offseason. This was Jordan's final season with the Chicago Bulls. Scottie Pippen was traded for Roy Rogers (who was released in February 1999) and a conditional second-round draft pick from the Houston Rockets. Dennis Rodman was not re-signed either, leading to the end of an era for the Bulls and the NBA.
 Houston Rockets guard Clyde Drexler retired after fifteen seasons, twelve of which he spent with the Portland Trail Blazers, where he led the team to two NBA Finals, in 1990 and 1992. He won his only NBA championship in 1995 while playing for the Rockets.
 Dallas Mavericks forward A.C. Green breaks the NBA's Iron Man Streak of most consecutive games played, surpassing Randy Smith who played 906 consecutive games.
 The restricted area arc known as the no charge zone was allowed.
 The NBA revert the three point field goal line back to 23 ft 9 inch from a uniform 22 ft beginning in 1994–95 season
 On February 27, the Indiana Pacers defeated the Portland Trail Blazers 124–59, marking the first time in NBA history that one team scored more than twice as many points as its opponent.
 Nike became the official outfitter for select NBA teams (Boston Celtics, Chicago Bulls, Dallas Mavericks, Detroit Pistons, Los Angeles Lakers, Miami Heat, Portland Trail Blazers, San Antonio Spurs, Toronto Raptors and Washington Wizards), which ran for seven years. Other NBA teams were outfitted by Starter Clothing Line, Puma, Reebok or Champion.
 The Denver Nuggets lost 71 games, joining the 1972–73 Philadelphia 76ers, 1986–87 Los Angeles Clippers, and 1992–93 Dallas Mavericks (plus subsequently the 2009–10 Nets and 2015–16 76ers) as the only teams to lose 70 games in a season. The Nuggets also equaled the longest single-season losing streak with 23 consecutive losses, sharing the mark with the 1995–96 Vancouver Grizzlies.
 All the Western Conference teams who missed the playoffs had 55 or more losses. Four of them lost more than 62 games. The ninth-placed Sacramento Kings finished the season with a 27–55 record, losing nineteen of their last twenty games. The Kings finished fourteen games behind the #8 seeded Houston Rockets, who finished with a 41–41 record, whilst the tenth-placed Dallas Mavericks ended with a 20–62 record. All the Eastern Conference teams who missed the playoffs had 31 or more wins except for the Toronto Raptors, who finished with a 16–66 record.
 Violet Palmer and Dee Kantner became the first two female officials in NBA history (as well as any of the four major professional sports leagues). Kantner would be fired following the 2001–02 season, while Palmer would go on to have long 19-year career before retiring after the 2015–16 season.

1997–98 NBA changes
 The Atlanta Hawks split their home games playing in the Alexander Memorial Coliseum and the Georgia Dome, due to the demolition of The Omni.
 The Charlotte Hornets changed their uniforms adding teal (home), and purple (road) to the side panels to their jerseys and shorts.
 The Chicago Bulls removed the pinstripes from their black alternate uniforms.
 The Cleveland Cavaliers slightly changed their uniforms.
 The Golden State Warriors changed their logo and uniforms, changing their colors to navy, orange and gold.
 The Indiana Pacers changed their uniforms adding pinstripes with side panels to their jerseys and shorts.
 The New Jersey Nets changed their logo and uniforms, replacing blue with navy to go with red and grey to their color scheme, added side panels to their jerseys and shorts.
 The New York Knicks changed their home uniforms, adding blue side panels to their jerseys and shorts. Meanwhile, the blue alternate road uniforms with black side panels to their jerseys and shorts they wore for the past two seasons became their primary road jersey.
 The Philadelphia 76ers changed their logo and uniforms, replacing their red, white and blue colors with black and gold.
 The Vancouver Grizzlies added new black road alternate uniforms.
 The Washington Bullets changed their name to the Washington Wizards, and got a new logo and new uniforms. They scrap the red, white and blue colors to blue, old gold and black. Also in December that season,  they moved into their new home arena called the MCI Center (later the Verizon Center, now Capital One Arena).

Final standings

By division

Eastern Conference

Western Conference

By conference

Notes
z – Clinched home court advantage for the entire playoffs
c – Clinched home court advantage for the conference playoffs
y – Clinched division title 
x – Clinched playoff spot

Playoffs
Teams in bold advanced to the next round. The numbers to the left of each team indicate the team's seeding in its conference, and the numbers to the right indicate the number of games the team won in that round. The division champions are marked by an asterisk. Home court advantage does not necessarily belong to the higher-seeded team, but instead the team with the better regular season record; teams enjoying the home advantage are shown in italics.

Statistics leaders

NBA awards

Yearly awards
Most Valuable Player: Michael Jordan, Chicago Bulls
Rookie of the Year: Tim Duncan, San Antonio Spurs
Defensive Player of the Year: Dikembe Mutombo, Atlanta Hawks
Sixth Man of the Year: Danny Manning, Phoenix Suns
Most Improved Player: Alan Henderson, Atlanta Hawks
Coach of the Year: Larry Bird, Indiana Pacers

All-NBA First Team:
F – Tim Duncan, San Antonio Spurs
F – Karl Malone, Utah Jazz
C – Shaquille O'Neal, Los Angeles Lakers
G – Michael Jordan, Chicago Bulls
G – Gary Payton, Seattle SuperSonics

All-NBA Second Team:
F – Vin Baker, Seattle SuperSonics
F – Grant Hill, Detroit Pistons
C – David Robinson, San Antonio Spurs
G – Tim Hardaway, Miami Heat
G – Rod Strickland, Washington Wizards

All-NBA Third Team:
F – Scottie Pippen, Chicago Bulls
F – Glen Rice, Charlotte Hornets
C – Dikembe Mutombo, Atlanta Hawks
G – Mitch Richmond, Sacramento Kings
G – Reggie Miller, Indiana Pacers

NBA All-Defensive First Team:
F – Scottie Pippen, Chicago Bulls
F – Karl Malone, Utah Jazz
C – Dikembe Mutombo, Atlanta Hawks
G – Gary Payton, Seattle SuperSonics
G – Michael Jordan, Chicago Bulls

NBA All-Defensive Second Team:
F – Charles Oakley, New York Knicks
F – Tim Duncan, San Antonio Spurs
C – David Robinson, San Antonio Spurs
G – Eddie Jones, Los Angeles Lakers
G – Mookie Blaylock, Atlanta Hawks

All-NBA Rookie First Team:
Tim Duncan, San Antonio Spurs
Keith Van Horn, New Jersey Nets
Zydrunas Ilgauskas, Cleveland Cavaliers
Ron Mercer, Boston Celtics
Brevin Knight, Cleveland Cavaliers

All-NBA Rookie Second Team:
Maurice Taylor, Los Angeles Clippers
Cedric Henderson, Cleveland Cavaliers
Tim Thomas, Philadelphia 76ers
Bobby Jackson, Denver Nuggets
Derek Anderson, Cleveland Cavaliers

Player of the week
The following players were named NBA Player of the Week.

Player of the month
The following players were named NBA Player of the Month.

Rookie of the month
The following players were named NBA Rookie of the Month.

Coach of the month
The following coaches were named NBA Coach of the Month.

References

 
NBA
1997–98 in Canadian basketball